is a Japanese tarento, fashion critic, journalist, and chanson singer. His younger identical twin brother is film critic Osugi, they both came out gay during their debut and took his advantage as a tarento and commentator.

Filmography

Current appearances

TV series

Irregular appearances

TV series

Former appearances

TV series

Radio

Advertisements

Bibliography

Solo

Co-author

Discography

LP records

Singles

Albums

References

Identical twins
Japanese critics
Japanese entertainers
1945 births
Living people
People from Yokohama
Gay entertainers
Japanese gay men
Fashion journalists